Zelenyi Hai is a village in Kherson Raion, Kherson Oblast, southern Ukraine. It belongs to the Chornobaivka rural hromada, one of the hromadas of Ukraine.

Administrative status 
Until 18 July, 2020, Zelenyi Hai belonged to Bilozerka Raion. The raion was abolished in July 2020 as part of the administrative reform of Ukraine, which reduced the number of raions of Kherson Oblast to five. The area of Bilozerka Raion was merged into Kherson Raion.

References

Villages in Kherson Raion
Chornobaivka rural hromada